Marcelo Antonio Macías Oliveri (born September 12, 1975 in Montevideo) is an Uruguayan football goalkeeper.

Club career
Macías currently plays for Real España in the Liga Nacional de Fútbol de Honduras. He played backup for Orlin Vallecillo, but became the first choice keeper when Orlin left the club.

References

External links
 
 

1975 births
Living people
Uruguayan footballers
Liga Nacional de Fútbol Profesional de Honduras players
Association football goalkeepers
Danubio F.C. players
Racing Club de Montevideo players
C.A. Rentistas players
Real C.D. España players
Expatriate footballers in Honduras